The Padrone Act of 1874 (18 Stat. 251) was enacted in the United States on June 23, 1874, in response to exploitation of immigrant children in forced begging by criminalizing the practice of enslaving, buying, selling, or holding any person in involuntary servitude according to the US Department of State brochures and resources on human trafficking and slavery.

In sum, the law was an anti-slavery law and the first human trafficking law criminalizing the slavery, buying and selling of Italians and Sicilians.

In the chronology of slavery, the University of Houston shows that in 1874 Congress enacted the Padrone statute "to prevent the practice of enslaving, buying, selling, or using Italian children" as street musicians and urchins.

1948 Federal criminal law is amended to enact 18 U.S.C. §§ 1581–1588, which ban peonage and involuntary servitude. The amendments are a consolidation of the 1874 Padrone Statute (formerly 18 U.S.C. § 446 (1940 ed.)) and the 1808 Slave Trade statute, as amended in 1909 (18 U.S.C. § 423 (1940 ed.)).

In the 1870s, according to the New York Times article "Slavery in New York", Aug. 21, 1873, the New York Times addresses Italian and Sicilian slavery that exists in 1873. This is referenced in the US Department of Labor resources

References

United States federal legislation
43rd United States Congress